Jay-Cee Nel (born ) is a South African rugby union player for the  in the Currie Cup. His regular position is centre.

He made his debut in the same fixture, starting the match at inside centre.

References

South African rugby union players
1999 births
Living people
Rugby union centres
Blue Bulls players
Griquas (rugby union) players
Bulls (rugby union) players